Several braille alphabets are used in Nigeria. For English, Unified English Braille has been adopted. Three other languages have been written in braille: Hausa, Igbo, and Yoruba. All three alphabets are based on English readings, with the addition of letters particular to these languages.  Punctuation is as in English Braille.

{|class=wikitable
|+Basic braille alphabet
|- align=center
|
|
|
|
|
|
|
|
|
|
|
|
|
|- align=center
|a||b||c||d||e||f||g||h||i||j||k||l||m
|- align=center
|
|
|
|
|
|
|
|
|
|
|
|
|
|- align=center
|n||o||p||q||r||s||t||u||v||w||x||y||z
|}

The letters of these languages beyond the basic Latin alphabet are as follows:

Hausa Braille 

Hausa includes

from English q, sh, st, ed (international second d), and three derived letters:

Hausa is presumably written in braille in Niger as well, since Ethnologue 17 reports that Zarma is written in braille in that country.  However, this need not mean it uses the same alphabet as Nigerian Hausa.

Igbo Braille 

Igbo Braille has

from English q, ch, gh, sh, and six other letters with common international/African values:

(See Ewe Braille and Kabiye Braille for similar code assignments.)

Yoruba Braille 

Yoruba Braille also has

(from English q, sh), and three derived letters:

The vowel assignments follow international conventions.

References
Braille Notation Booklet on the Hausa, Igbo, and Yoruba Orthographies: A Research Work on Standard Braille Codes for the Blind in Nigeria, March 1981 – April 1982
UNESCO (2013) World Braille Usage, 3rd edition.

French-ordered braille alphabets
English language
Yoruba language
Hausa language
Igbo language